Nijrāb (Pashto/Persian: نجراب)  is a city with five valleys in Kapisa Province, Afghanistan. There are a medical clinic, schools and radio station in the District. Nijrab is the most populous city of Kapisa, while Nijrab District, with a population of 114,726 (2015), is also the most populous district of Kapisa.

Five valleys in Nijrab are:
 Kharej Dara خارج دره
 Dara-e Puta درۀ پته
 Dara-e Farukh Shah درۀ فرخ شاه
 Dara-e Kalan درۀ کلان
 Dara-e Ghaws درۀ غوث

References

Populated places in Kapisa Province